Quissac is the name of 2 communes in France:

 Quissac, Gard, in the Gard department
 Quissac, Lot, in the Lot department